Manuel Espinosa (Buenos Aires, 1912 - Buenos Aires, Argentina, 2006) was an Argentinian painter.

Biography
Espinosa graduated from the Escuela Nacional de Artes and finished his studies in the Escuela Superior de Bellas Artes. He is one of the leaders of the geometric art in Argentina. He was a founding member of the asociación de Arte Concreto-Invención which was established in Buenos Aires in 1943.

Averaging the 2nd World War, the group proposed a rupture as an alternative. Said rupture was related to the search for a new visual language corresponding to the exigencies of a new technological, industrial society. The group sustained common goals: the art should be non-figurative art, the painting flat, and the illusions and appearances banished, moving away from traditional painting. They looked for the worth of the painting itself. In 1951 he traveled to Europe and met Vantongerloo in Paris and Vordemberge-Gildewarth in Amsterdam, who guided him in his pursuit.

Upon the dissolution of the group, Espinosa left the common goals but remained faithful to the spirit of non-figuration and produced a painting constructed from geometric elements, characterized by a rigorous system of order and by the perfection of their registers. Clarity, moderation, are attributes of his painting, which with minimal elements arranged serially produce subtle effects of color and space and a dynamic tension that creates an impression of depth. It employs transparencies, juxtapositions superpositions that generate an optical effect of unquestionable interest. He is one of the painters who most enjoys the game aroused by reason and sensitivity, a consequence of his special relationship with music and literature.

Exhibitions
He is a founding member of the group Arte Concreto-Invención. Since 1939 he carried out many individual and collective exhibits, among them:
 1946: Primera exposición de la Asociación Arte Concreto-Invención. Buenos Aires, Salón Peuser
 1947: Manuel O. Espinosa- Tomás Maldonado. Buenos Aires, Socidad Argentina de Artistas Plásticos; Arte Nuevo. Buenos Aires
 1962: Forma y espacio. Museo de Arte Contemporáneo, Santiago de Chile, Chile.
 1963: Ocho artistas constructivos, Museo Nacional de Bellas Artes; Del Arte Concreto a la nueva tendencia, Museo de Arte Moderno.
 1965: Tredici pittori ospiti di Roma. Roma, Librería Feltrinelli; Primera muestra de artistas residentes en Italia. Roma, Casa Argentina, Embajada Argentina.
 1966: Grupo G 13. Buenos Aires, Roland Lambert Gallery; Once pintores constructivos. Buenos Aires, Forum Galería de Arte; Primer Salón Air France. Buenos Aires, Galería Lascaux.
 1967: Mas allá de la Geometría, Instituto Di Tella; Salon Comparaisons 67, Musee d'Art Moderne de la Ville de Paris, Paris.
 1968: Materiales, nuevas técnicas, nuevas expressiones, Museo Nacional de Bellas Artes; Premio Fundación Lorenzutti, Sala Nacional de Exposiciones.
 1969: Tercer Panorama de la Pintura Argentina, Sala Nacional de Exposiciones, Buenos Aires.
 1970: Club Constructivo, Galería Ales, Praga, Republica Checa; Veinticuatro artistas argentinos, Museo Nacional de Bellas Artes, Buenos Aires, Argentina. Biennale Intertationale de Capmes- Sur- Mer, Francia.
 1971: LX Salón Nacional de Artes Plásticas, Museo de Arte Decorativo, Buenos Aires.
 1972: Museo de la Solidaridad. Instituto de Arte Latinoamericano, Santiago de Chile.
 1973: Projection et dynamisme. Six peintres argentins, Musee d'Art Moderne de la ville de Paris, Paris, Francia;
 1974: Actualles Tendances de l' art argentin. Ville Arson, Centre Artistique de Rencontres Internacionales, Nice, Francia.;  Manuel Espinosa, Caracas, Centro Venezolano Argentino de Cooperación Cultural y Científico-Tecnológica, Venezuela; Galería Contemporánea, Montevideo, Uruguay.
 1975: Arte Argentino Contemporáneo, Museo de Arte Moderno, Mexico DF.
 1976: Dos tendencias: Geometría- Surrealismo, Museo Nacional de Bellas Artes, Buenos Aires, Argentina.
 1977: Arte actual de Iberoamerica, Centro Cultural de la Villa de Madrid, Madrid, España;
 1977-8: Panorma atual de jovem pintura Argentina, Museu de Arte Brasileira da Fundacao Armando Alvares Penteado, San Pablo, Brasil.
 1977-9: Recent Latin American Darwings, Lines of Vision, Nueva York, USA.
 1978: The Argentinean Exposition, The Armas Gallery, Miami.
 1980: Arte argentino contemporáneo. The 13th Internacional Art Exhibition. Museo Metropolitano, Tokio, Japon; Ottawa, National Arts Centre, Robson Square Media Centre, Vancouver, Canada.
 1987-88: Arte Argentina Della independenza ad oggi 1810–1987, Roma, Genova, Italia.
 1987: Roma, Italia.
 1988-9: Siete maestros argentinos. Mittelrhein Museum, Schaumburg, Alemania Federal; Museum Moderner Kunst, Viena, Austria; Komberley Gallery, Washington D.C, Estados Unidos.
 1994: Art from Argentina 1920–1994. Museum of Modern Art, Oxford, Gran Bretaña.
 2001: Premio Rosario 2001. Rosario, Museo Municipal de Bellas Artes Juan B. Castagnino; Abstract Art from Rio de la Plata. Buenos Aires and Montevideo 1033–1953. The Americas Society, Nueva York, USA.
 2002: Arte Argentino del siglo XX, Lima, Perú; Surface and Subtext, The Jack Barton Museum of Art, Austin, EEUU.
 2002–2003: Arte Abstracto Argentino, Galeria d' Arte Moderna e Contemporanea di Bergamo, Italia.
 2003: Geometrias. Abstracción geométrica latinoamericana en la Colección Cisneros, Museo de Arte latinoamericano Buenos Aires.
 2003: Antología sobre papel. Museo de Arte Moderno, Buenos Aires, Argentina.
 2004–2005: Utopia of Forum, Argentine Concrete Art, Miami.
 2009: Espinosa en el Museo Nacional de Bellas Artes de Neuquén, Neuquén, Argentina.
 2010: Sicardi Gallery. Houston, EE UU.
 2014: Stephen Friedman Gallery, London.
 2018: Stephen Friedman Gallery, London.
 2019: Black and White: Works on Paper from the 1970s. Stephen Friedman Gallery, London.

Collections
 Museo Nacional de Bellas Artes (National Museum of Fine Arts), Buenos Aires, Argentina.
 Museo de Arte Moderno (Museum of Modern Art), Buenos Aires, Argentina.
 Museo Municipal Eduardo Sivori (Eduardo Sivori Municipal Museum), Buenos Aires, Argentina.
 Museo de Bellas Artes de la Provincia de Buenos Aires (Museum of Fine Arts of the Province of Buenos Aires), La Plata, Argentina.
 Museo Municipal de Bellas Artes de Rosario Juan B. Castagnino (Municipal Museum of Fine Arts), Rosario, Argentina.
 Museo Nacional de Bellas Artes de Neuquén (National Museum of Fine Arts of Neuquén), Neuquén, Argentina.
 Museo Municipal de Arte de Mar del Plata (Municipal Museum of Art of Mar del Plata), Argentina.
 Museo de Arte Contemporáneo (Museum of Contemporaneous Art), Helft Collection, Buenos Aires, Argentina.
 Windows South Space, California, United States.
 Museum of Art of Rhode Island, Providence, United States.
 Casa de la Cultura Ecuatoriana (House of the Ecuadorian Culture), Quito, Ecuador.

Awards
 Air France Award – First Saloon Air France of Painting, 1966.
 First Prize – D Category and Special Mention - A & B categories – First Saloon Hisisa of Art Applied to the Textile Industry, 1967.
 Acquisition Award – Saloon of Art Mar del Plata, 1967.
 Mention Award Painting Section– LVI National Saloon of Plastic Arts, 1967
 Medal –Automóvil Club Argentino Award, 1969.
 Rotary Club Award, XVIII National Saloon of Córdoba, 1970.
 Great Acquisition Award –Municipal Saloon of Plastic Arts "Manuel Belgrano", 1971.
 Third Prize – LX National Saloon of Plastic Arts, 1971
 Merit Diploma, Konex Award of Visual Arts – 1982.
 Artistic Career – National Fund of Arts, 1993
 Stamps of Artist – Stamps of Andreani Foundation y ArteBA Foundation, 2001.
 Castagnino Award – Municipal Museum of Fine Arts Juan B. Castagnino, Rosario, 2001.

Bibliography

References

External links

 https://www.coleccionespinosa.com/

1912 births
2006 deaths
20th-century Argentine painters
Argentine male painters
20th-century Argentine male artists